Super Black Racing was a New Zealand motor racing team that competed in the Australian Supercars Championship between 2014 and 2016.

History

Super Black Racing was conceived in 2014 by Paul Radisich with the aim of forming a New Zealand team to enter the V8 Supercars Championship.

In June 2014, it was announced the team had been formed with backing from Tony Lentino and Andrew Hiskens.

The team debuted at the 2014 Bathurst 1000 with Ant Pedersen and Andre Heimgartner finishing 11th. The team raced a Ford Falcon FG leased from and prepared by Prodrive Racing Australia. 

Super Black Racing started the 2015 series with Heimgartner driving a customer Prodrive Racing Australia Falcon FG with a Racing Entitlement Contract (REC) leased from DJR Team Penske. A few rounds into the 2015 V8 Supercars season, Super Black Racing upgraded to a Ford FG X Falcon. After driving in the last two rounds of 2015, Chris Pither drove the car in 2016. With DJR Team Penske taking back its REC, Super Black purchased one from Walkinshaw Racing.

With help from MW Motorsport, the team also ran a Falcon FG for Simon Evans in the 2015 Development Series.

The team raced with number 111, in memory of Mark Porter. Following the death of Lentino, the team ended at the end of 2016 with the REC sold to Tim Blanchard.

V8 Supercar drivers
The following is a list of drivers who have driven for the team in V8 Supercars, in order of their first appearance. Drivers who only drove for the team on a part-time basis are listed in italics.
 Andre Heimgartner (2014–15)
 Ant Pedersen (2014–15)
 Chris Pither (2015–16)
 Richie Stanaway (2016)

Complete Bathurst 1000 results

References

External links

Defunct sports teams in New Zealand
New Zealand auto racing teams
Auto racing teams established in 2014
Auto racing teams disestablished in 2016
Supercars Championship teams
2014 establishments in New Zealand
2016 disestablishments in New Zealand